Peter Fortunate Vallone Jr. (born March 23, 1961) is an American judge and lawyer.

Vallone was a member of the New York City Council representing the 22nd district, encompassing Astoria, Queens and the surrounding communities from 2002 to 2013. Vallone served as Chair of the Council's Public Safety Committee.

Early life
Vallone is the son of former Speaker of the City Council, Peter Vallone Sr., and his wife, Tena. He is also a grandson of Judge Charles J. Vallone of the Queens County Civil Court. He is the brother of former New York City Councilman Paul Vallone.

Education
He graduated from Fordham University in 1983 and from Fordham University School of Law in 1986.

Career
Before being elected to the City Council, Vallone worked as an Assistant to the Manhattan District Attorney for six years. His notable legislation included several anti-graffiti bills.

He has been honored by the Council of Senior Centers and Services of New York City, the Immaculate Conception Youth Program (ICYP), the League of Humane Voters, and other organizations.

In February 2014, Vallone Jr. was named one of America’s Top Ten Animal Defenders by the Animal Legal Defense Fund based on his long career of helping animals.

Vallone opposed proliferation of power plants and represented C.H.O.K.E. (Coalition Helping Organize a Kleaner Environment) and Astoria residents in court, winning a victory against the New York Power Authority leading to the closing of the Charles Poletti Power Plant in 2010. Vallone also opposes water fluoridation in New York.

In April 2009 Vallone supported a proposed ban on pit bulls, Dobermans, Rottweilers, and other dogs weighing more than 25 lbs. in NYC public housing.

In 2013, Vallone ran for Queens borough president but lost to Melinda Katz in the primary held on September 10, 2013. He received 37,132 votes, or 33.7%, falling short of Katz's 48,975 votes, or 44.5%, and came second in a four-way race. Having been term-limited out of office, Vallone was succeeded in city council by Costa Constantinides on January 1, 2014.

In 2015 Vallone was nominated to be a Criminal Court judge in Queens and was sworn in January 2016. The term of a Civil Court Judge is 10 years. This is the position his grandfather, Charles Vallone, had served in.

Personal life
Vallone was invited to play against the Chinese National Ping-Pong team on ABC's Wide World of Sports, was Co-Captain of the Astoria Civic City Champion Football and Softball teams. He is a professional musician, playing four instruments. graduated magna cum laude and Phi Beta Kappa from Fordham College and from Fordham Law School.  Vallone is also a Roman Catholic.

He was married to Kristen Anne Canberg and has since been divorced and has two daughters, Catherine (Casey) and Caroline. His brother, Paul Vallone, was elected to the City Council in the 19th district in 2013.

References

External links
 Official NYC Council Website member page
 Campaign Website
 Map Of District 22

Fordham University alumni
New York (state) state court judges
New York City Council members
American people of Italian descent
Living people
New York (state) Democrats
New York (state) lawyers
People from Queens, New York
1961 births
Vallone family
Recycling in New York City